August Victor Louis of Saxe-Coburg and Gotha (13 June 1818 – 26 July 1881), was a German prince of the Catholic House of Saxe-Coburg and Gotha-Koháry. He was a General Major in the Royal Saxon Army and the owner of Čábráď and Štiavnica, both in modern-day Slovakia.

Life 
Born Prince August Viktor Ludwig of Saxe-Coburg-Saalfeld, he was the second son of Prince Ferdinand of Saxe-Coburg-Saalfeld. He was born in Vienna on 13 June 1818 and baptised at St. Stephan Cathedral on the 16th of that month. His godparents were his paternal grandmother, Countess Augusta Reuss of Ebersdorf, his aunts, Victoria, Duchess of Kent and Louise, Duchess of Saxe Coburg. Following the 1826 re-distribution in the House of Wettin of the Ernestine duchies, his dynastic suffix became "of Saxe-Coburg and Gotha". His mother was Princess Maria Antonia Koháry de Csábrág et Szitnya, the daughter and heiress of Ferenc József, Prince Koháry de Csábrág et Szitnya. When Antonia's father died in 1826, she inherited his estates in Slovakia and Hungary. Prince August was a younger brother of King-Consort Ferdinand II of Portugal, a nephew of Leopold I of Belgium, and a first cousin of Britain's Queen Victoria, and her husband, Prince Albert.
 
In Saint-Cloud on 20 April 1843 August married Princess Clémentine of Orléans, daughter of Louis Philippe, King of the French, and of his wife, Princess Maria Amalia of the Two Sicilies.  The couple lived in Palais Coburg in Vienna.  He also owned Bürglaß Castle in Coburg.  When his mother died in 1862, he inherited her extensive landholdings in Hungary and became one of the largest landowners in the country. He was an honorary member of the Hungarian Geological Society.

Prince August built a Catholic church in Coburg. It was consecrated in 1860 and was named St. Augustin. He was later buried in the crypt below this church, as were his wife, his three sons, his daughter-in-law Leopoldina and her four sons.

August was a recipient of the Grand Cross of the Saxe-Ernestine House Order, the Portuguese royal Order of the Tower and Sword, the French Legion of Honour and the Belgian royal Order of Leopold.  Furthermore, he was a knight of honour and devotion in the Sovereign Military Order of Malta.

Memorial 
In 1885, the Austrian sculptor Viktor Tilgner was commissioned to create a memorial for the late Prince August. The sculpture still stands on private land in Ebenthal owned by the Saxe-Coburg ducal family. The base of the sculpture contains a Latin inscription and a text in French:  ("August Louis Victor, Duke of Saxony, Prince of Saxe-Coburg-Gotha. To my beloved husband." — 1843 is not the year August was born (he was born in 1818), but rather the year he married Clémentine).

Marriage and issue 
In Saint-Cloud on 20 April 1843 August married Princess Clémentine of Orléans, daughter of Louis Philippe, King of the French. They had five children:
 Ferdinand Philipp Maria August Raphael (b. Paris, 28 March 1844 - d. Coburg, 3 July 1921).
 Ludwig August Maria Eudes (b. Château d'Eu, 8 August 1845 - d. Karlsbad, 14 September 1907), married on 15 December 1864 to Princess Leopoldina of Brazil.
 Marie Adelaide Amalie Clotilde (b. Neuilly, 8 July 1846 - d. Alcsút, Hungary, 3 June 1927), married on 12 May 1864 to Archduke Joseph Karl of Austria.
 Marie Luise Franziska Amalie (b. Coburg, 23 October 1848 - d. Schloß Biederstein, 6 May 1894), married on 20 September 1875 to Maximilian Emanuel, Duke in Bavaria.
 Ferdinand Maximilian Karl Leopold Maria (b. Vienna, 26 February 1861 - d.

On 2 May 1881, Emperor Franz Joseph I of Austria bestowed upon August and his descendants the style of Hoheit ("Highness"), a higher style in Germany than Durchlaucht ("Serene Highness"), which Ernestine princes were usually entitled to. The reason for the grant was that eight days later Princess Stéphanie of Belgium (younger sister of August's daughter-in-law Louise) was to marry Franz Joseph's son Crown Prince Rudolf; Franz Joseph considered it appropriate that his son's in-laws have a higher rank at the Austrian court.

Honours 
He received the following awards:
 : Knight of the Golden Fleece, 1862
 : Grand Cordon of the Order of Leopold, 3 June 1844
 : Grand Cross of the Southern Cross
    Ernestine duchies: Grand Cross of the Saxe-Ernestine House Order, February 1836
  Kingdom of France: Grand Cross of the Legion of Honour, May 1840
 : Bailiff Grand Cross of Honour and Devotion
 : Grand Cross of the Tower and Sword, 23 April 1836
 : Knight of the Rue Crown, 1848

Ancestry

External links

Footnotes 

1818 births
1881 deaths
Nobility from Vienna
House of Saxe-Coburg-Gotha-Koháry
Princes of Saxe-Coburg and Gotha
Knights of the Golden Fleece of Austria
Grand Croix of the Légion d'honneur